The Bosut is a river in the Syrmia region of eastern Croatia and northwestern Serbia, a 186 km long left tributary of the Sava river. Slow and meandering, it originates from the confluence of Biđ and Berava rivers south of the city of Vinkovci, the only major city on its course, and then turns southeast. Near Lipovac it receives its major tributary Spačva, and then enters Serbia near Batrovci. In its lower course, Bosut flows through a forested area in the Spačva region. The river is generally known for its abundance of fish.

Its name from the Indo-European root *bhogj, meaning "to flow". The same root is seen in hydronym "Bosna".

Course

Headwaters
The Bosut originates as the Biđ (or Bič) river in central Slavonia region, on the southern slopes of the Dilj mountain, northwest of the city of Slavonski Brod. Generally flowing to the northeast, it has no major settlements though some larger villages are in the vicinity of the river (Donji Andrijevci, Vrpolje and Strizivojna).

The Berava is a small river that rises south of Velika Kopanica, meanders eastwards near Gundinci and Babina Greda, and turns north near Gradište, south of Cerna.

Downstream of Cerna
In the village of Cerna, the Biđ receives the river Berava from the south and from this point it is known as the Bosut. Some maps though, indicate that name Bosut is used before the river reaches Cerna, and some other apply the name also for the lowest part of the Berava's course, between Gradište and Cerna.

Turning north from there, the river flows into the region of Syrmia, and the villages of Andrijaševci and Rokovci, reaching the biggest settlement on its course, the city of Vinkovci. From there, the rivers turns to the southeast, which is the direction it will follow for the rest of its course, except for a large U-bend south of Vinkovci. It passes through Kunjevci, Nijemci, Podgrađe, Apševci and Lipovac, where it receives the river Spačva from the right, and after the flow of 151 km through Croatia, crosses the Serbian border.

The Bosut enters Serbia at the village of Batrovci and flows through the southwesternmost part of the province of Vojvodina. It continues through the villages of Morović (where it receives the river Studva from the right, its major tributary in Serbia) and Višnjićevo, makes a turn north of Sremska Rača and, after 28 km in Serbia, empties into the Sava at the village of Bosut. A Slezen pond, near Morović, is located in the river's valley.

Characteristics 

For some 40 km it is navigable for smaller vessels.

The river is known as meandering and extremely slow, and it has a very small declination in its basin – less than 10 m from Vinkovci until its mouth. Bosut is known as 'the river that flows backwards', because sometimes, with strong winds and being so slow, it appears as if the water is flowing backwards.

The whole valley of the Biđ-Bosut is actually an old, fossil river bed of the Sava. It is also known as a region with the highest evaporation in both Croatia and Serbia. In its lower course, Bosut flows through a forested area in the region of Spačva. The river is generally known for its abundance of fish.

See also
 Bosut culture

References 

 Mala Prosvetina Enciklopedija, Third edition (1985); Prosveta; 
 Jovan Đ. Marković (1990): "Enciklopedijski geografski leksikon Jugoslavije"; Svjetlost-Sarajevo;

External links

Rivers of Croatia
Rivers of Serbia
Geography of Vojvodina
International rivers of Europe
Slavonia
Syrmia
Geography of Vukovar-Syrmia County